A Philosothon is an annual competition wherein students explore philosophical and ethical issues. Philosothons are held in all Australian states, New Zealand, and the UK, annually.

At a Philosothon, school-aged students are assessed by university-based professional philosophers and score highly where they demonstrate rigour and clarity of thought. An essential component of a Philosothon is the pedagogical model for teaching Philosophy to young people called Community of inquiry. The event has grown alongside and within the Philosophy for Children movement. The first Australasian Philosothon was held at Cranbrook School, Sydney in 2011 and the first UK Philosothon was held in 2012 at King's College, Taunton.

History 
In 2007, Hale School in Perth, Western Australia initiated a project to promote higher-order thinking among secondary school students. The Head of Philosophy and Ethics Mr. Matthew Wills, created the event to promote student engagement in the study of Philosophy.  At the first Philosothon nine local high school teams, each including five students came together for an evening of philosophical investigation. The word 'Philosothon' was invented in the first few years of the event by Matthew Wills and Leanne Rucks.

Recent history 
Following the first Philosothon, it was decided to promote the event more broadly to other schools around the country and later in the UK. Philosothons now take place annually in each Australian capital city and in regional locations around Australia and New Zealand.  Primary school Philosothons have been conducted in various Art Galleries in some Australian states and in the UK. Philosothons have been established in regional cities throughout Australia and New Zealand and a similar growth is spearheaded by Academy Conferences in the UK where various regional hubs are emerging, such as Stowe.

In 2017 The Templeton Religion Trust awarded $281,656 AUD to the Philosothon project in order to "grow existing Philosothons and support the establishment of new ones, particularly in remote schools and at schools catering for students from low socio-economic backgrounds" in Australasia. Similar funding was awarded to the Ian Ramsey Centre at Oxford University to expand the UK Philosothon initiative in 2019. They Philosothons also take place around the UK with introductory presentations given to teachers at Academy Conferences multiple times each year. More recently the University of Western Australia was awarded a grant from the Templeton Religion Trust to continue the Philosothon Project focusing on developing Philosothons in remote and regional parts of Australia and New Zealand. Matthew Wills was appointed the Project Manager. As part of the expansion of Philosothons in the UK, introductory presentations to teachers have explained the concept at more than 15 Academy Conferences events, as well as ISRSA and NATRE conferences. These presentations have been accompanied by associated outreach work, including the development of a website and more than 500 flash drives so far for distributing introductory and administrative material, generously funded by the Templeton Religion Trust.

In 2020 the Australasian Association of Philosophy ran the first online Philosothon. With the arrival of the Corona Virus and travel restrictions, the 2020 Australasian Philosothon was held online with twenty-one Australian and New Zealand schools participating.

Rationale and process 
The rationale for the Philosothon methodology is based on empirical evidence that teaching children reasoning skills early in life greatly improves other cognitive and academic skills and greatly assists learning in general. Students are given the topic questions in advance and some stimulus reading materials.

Examples of topic questions from recent Philosothons are these:

 Is it moral to fake kindness? (Moral Philosophy)
 Do men and woman have different natures? (Metaphysical)
 Do you have free will? (Metaphysical)
 Should you always listen to the opinions of others? (Epistemology)
 How free should speech be? (Political Philosophy)

Due to COVID restrictions, online Philsothons have been developed recently. In any case students, teachers and parents gather, either online or face to face on a particular evening each year for the event. The students participate in a series of four Philosophical Community of inquiry discussions which are facilitated by teachers or Phd. philosophy students from the local universities. While participating in this process students are scored by Philosophy lecturers also from local universities. The scores are then collated, ranked and later awards are given to students at each age level and encouragement awards to the most promising male and female philosopher. Also, a trophy is awarded to the winning school.

Australasian Philosothon 
In July 2011 the first National Philosothon was held at Cranbrook School. Each Australian state sent three teams (those schools that won in their regional Philosothon) and so twelve schools in total arrived in Sydney to participate in the inaugural event.
 Each year the Australasian Philosothon is run in a different region in Australasia. In 2019 the ninth Australasian Philosothon was held at Radford College in Canberra. In 2020 the Australasian Philosothon was hosted for the first time online by the Australasian Association of Philosophy.

United Kingdom 
Philosothons have been run in the UK since 2013. Revd. Mark Smith & Julie Arliss from the Philosophy of Religion and Ethics Department at King's College, Taunton, UK, have spearheaded the Philosothon movement in the United Kingdom in collaboration with Dr Michael Lacewing from Heythrop College and Lizzy Lewis from Sapere. Wells Cathedral College won the first event. More recently Philosothons have been developed throughout the UK, promoted at Academy Conferences events and spreading from the UK hub at King's College, Taunton; with more than 375 attendees in the year 2019-2020 (more events were postponed due to COVID-19). Primary School Philosothons have also been hosted by the Philosophy Foundation. Other Philosothons have been held around the UK.

Primary and Middle School Philosothons 
In 2012 an inaugural Primary School Philosothon was held at the National Gallery of Victoria (NGV). 
 In 2013 the first WA Primary school Philosothon was hosted by John XXIII College at the Art Gallery of WA. Since then Annual Primary School Philosothons have been conducted in Victoria, WA and the UK.

References

External links
 http://www.philosothon.org
 http://www.philosothon.co.uk/
 https://aap.org.au/Philosothon

Australian educational programs
Educational projects
Philosophy events
Annual events in Australia